Cape Dayman is a cape on the north side of Tapsell Foreland that forms the south side of the entrance to Yule Bay, in Victoria Land, Antarctica. It was discovered by Captain James Clark Ross in 1841, who named it after Joseph Dayman, mate on the ship Erebus. The cape lies situated on the Pennell Coast, a portion of Antarctica lying between Cape Williams and Cape Adare.

References
 

Headlands of Victoria Land
Pennell Coast